The High Representative for Bosnia and Herzegovina, together with the Office of the High Representative (OHR) in Bosnia and Herzegovina, were created in 1995 immediately after the signing of the Dayton Agreement which ended the 1992–1995 Bosnian War. The purpose of the High Representative and the OHR is to oversee the civilian implementation of the Dayton agreement. They also serve to represent the countries involved in the implementation of the Dayton Agreement through the Peace Implementation Council (PIC), which chooses the High Representative.

So far, all of the High Representatives named have been from European Union countries, while their principal deputies have been from the United States. The Principal Deputy High Representative serves as International Supervisor for Brčko, representing the international community in the Brčko District. 

Due to the vast powers of the High Representative over Bosnian politics and essential veto powers, the position has been compared to that of a viceroy.

Legal basis in the Dayton Peace Agreements
The Dayton Agreement created the legal basis for the OHR. Its Annex 10 provides for the institution of the Office of the High Representative (OHR) in Bosnia and Herzegovina to oversee the civilian implementation of the agreement, representing the countries involved in the Dayton Accords through the Peace Implementation Council.

The "Bonn Powers" of the OHR

At its December 1997 meeting in Bonn, the Peace Implementation Council agreed in granting further substantial powers to the OHR, in order to avoid the implementation of the Dayton Agreement being delayed or obstructed by local nationalist politicians. The OHR was requested to:
 adopt binding decisions when local parties seem unable or unwilling to act;
 remove from office public officials who violate legal commitments or, in general, the DPA.

The Bonn powers were extensively used by the OHR in the following decade. Some examples include the adoption of the Defence reform in April 2003, with the suppression of the Supreme Defence Council of the Republika Srpska, and the amendment of Entity Constitutional Laws.

Until 2004, the OHR had dismissed a total of 139 officials, including judges, ministers, civil servants and members of parliaments, sometimes along with freezing their bank accounts. After the 2002 elections, the OHR scrutinised all political candidates for major ministerial positions at Entity and State level.

Criticisms of the action of the OHR through its Bonn powers include:
the lack of accountability of his position, which is only responsible to the Peace Implementation Council;
the lack of appeal of his decisions, which are not bound on a preliminary hearing of the concerned persons, and which have immediate effect. Removals may in some cases also impose a life-ban on public offices.
The Parliamentary Assembly of the Council of Europe, which Bosnia and Herzegovina had joined in 2002, has voiced complaints against the actions of the OHR, requiring it to transfer his powers to the Bosnian authorities as soon as possible.

The OHR's prolonged interference in the politics of Bosnia and Herzegovina is also considered to be one of the causes of the low commitment of citizens towards the state (shown by low voter turnout) and of low accountability of politicians (whose actions are finally subject to external review).

Fusion with the EUSR post
Between 2002 and 2011, the High Representative also served as the European Union Special Representative to Bosnia and Herzegovina.

Under Christian Schwarz-Schilling, the OHR seemed to soften its invasiveness, thanks to pressures from the Council of Europe and a growing EU involvement. The number of OHR legislative initiatives and of dismissed officials lowered.

On 27 February 2008, the PIC decided to end the High Representative's mandate on 30 June 2008. The EU decision to shut down the OHR by June 2007 unexpectedly aroused disappointment and concern in the Bosnian population, NGOs, and politicians.
However, since the PIC February 2008 review, it was decided to extend that mandate indefinitely until a set of positive benchmarks have been fulfilled.

The "double hatting" between EUSR and OHR was discontinued in 2011, when the EU representative post was fused between the EUSR and the head of the EU delegation.

Conditions for closure of the Office of the High Representative

In February 2008, the Peace Implementation Council set the conditions for closure of the OHR. The most critical issues will be considered objectives to be achieved by the BiH authorities before transition from OHR to a European Union presence can take place. From a long list of known priorities the PIC selected the key ones for transition, for closure of OHR:
Resolution of State Property
Resolution of Defence Property
Completion of the Brčko Final Award
Fiscal Sustainability of the State – completed as of May 2010, should be continuously sustained
Entrenchment of the Rule of Law  – completed as of May 2010, should be continuously sustained
In addition to these objectives there are also two conditions:
signing of the Stabilisation and Association Agreement – completed on 16 June 2008
positive assessment of the situation in BiH by the PIC Steering Board – to be assessed after all others are completed
An additional non-written condition to be enforced through the "assessment by the PIC Steering Board" final condition, was adopted later by the US and some EU countries:
reform of the constitution to comply with ECHR decision of December 2009

The closure of the OHR is considered by the Steering Board of the Peace Implementation Council to be a pre-condition for EU membership.

List of High Representatives

List of Principal Deputy High Representatives
The second-ranking official at the Office of the High Representative carries the title of "Principal Deputy High Representative (PDHR)."   For many years, the individual filling that role has been an official of the United States Government, in most cases a career Foreign Service Officer of the U.S. Department of State.   Throughout much of OHR's earlier history, there were also individuals who held the title of "Deputy High Representative," a rank just below that of the PDHR.

See also

EUFOR Althea – European peacekeeping force for overseeing the military implementation of the Dayton agreement.
European Union Police Mission in Bosnia and Herzegovina – Police mission in the framework of the European Union's Common Foreign and Security Policy, helping local police with organized crime and police reform.
Special Representative of the Secretary-General for Kosovo

References

External links

Reports of the High Representative for Implementation of the Peace Agreement on Bosnia and Herzegovina to the Secretary-General of the United Nations
"Bosnia: Europe's time to act", International Crisis Group report, 11 January 2011; on the scenarios of closure of the OHR and the transfer of EUSR powers to the EU delegation in Sarajevo.

Politics of Bosnia and Herzegovina
Government of Bosnia and Herzegovina
Foreign relations of the European Union
 
1995 establishments in Bosnia and Herzegovina